The 1966 Langhorne 100 was held on Sunday, June 12, 1966. The race was won by Mario Andretti. The race was completed in one hour. It was the fifth race of the sixteen race season. The average speed of 98.69 mph.

Summary
The race was held on June 12. Mario Andretti took the pole with Don Branson starting next to him in a Sprint Car (which Branson claimed was much easier to handle on this track). Upon getting the green flag Andretti moved into the lead pulling away from Branson. Gary Congdon moved into a comfortable third. By lap two Andretti was 8 car links ahead of Branson and Congdon, showing the superiority of the rear engine cars. Jim McElreath who started 11th, maneuvered up to 6th position early in the race. On lap 26 George Snider and Art Pollard spun out and collide with the outside wall. The race goes under its first caution with Andretti still leading. When the race resumed Andretti pulled away once again. On lap 55 Congdon who was third at the time pit with gearbox problems, taking him out of the race. Midway through the race McElreath passed Joe Leonard moving him into 3rd. Andretti at this time led by half a lap. McElreath then passed Branson for 2nd. On lap 56, Gordon Johncock pit with universal joint issues. This put him out of the race. Jim Hurtubise Passed Branson's sprint car to move him into 3rd. On lap 65 Bud Tingelstad dropped out with engine failure. On lap 71 Hurtubise spun out and smashed into the infield fence. He is OK, but down for the count, his car is beat up plus has a flattened right rear tire. This brings out a second yellow. On the restart Al Unser moves into third passing Leonard. Andretti has a two-second lead over McElreath. On lap 78 Bob Hurt and Ronnie Dunman crash when Dunman spins causing Hurt to go into the wall. Dunman is OK and continues the race but Hurt is out. This brings out the third yellow. On the restart Andretti pulls away from McElreath. On lap 89 Bobby Unser 's rear engine car leaks oil on the track, he is out. Sam Sessions spins out bringing out a fourth and final yellow. The white flag is presented along with the yellow as the cars have one more lap to go. Andretti takes the checkered and wins under yellow. He completed the race in one hour. This put him third in USAC standings.

Results

References
 http://racing-reference.info/race/1966_Langhorne_100/UO

1966 in American motorsport
Motorsport in Pennsylvania